Muqarrab, Moqarreb or Moqarrab, also rendered as Mogharrab, may refer to:

 Muqarrab (Sufism), a follower in Sufism
 Muqarrab Khan, 17th-century Indian commander
 Moqarrab-e Yek, Fars Province
 Mogharrab-e Do, Fars Province
 Moqarrab, Kerman Province